Adelphostigma is a genus of snakes of the family Colubridae.

Species
 Adelphostigma occipitalis (Jan, 1863)
 Adelphostigma quadriocellata Santos, Di-Bernardo & de Lema, 2008

References 

Adelphostigma
Snake genera